Ak-Terek is a village in Osh Region of Kyrgyzstan about 43 km northeast of Özgön and 4 km northeast of Salam-Alik on the Jazy river. It is part of the Özgön District. Its population was 1,349 in 2021. It is a base for horse trekking in the Fergana Range.

References 

Populated places in Osh Region